The Fullerton Dam is a ruined dam located  northwest of Olustee, in Jackson County, Oklahoma. Farmer William J. Fullerton built the dam across Turkey Creek in the mid-1890s to irrigate the vegetable crops on his  farm. As western Oklahoma was a dry region, farmers depended on a regular water supply to produce crops, making Fullerton's dam an important innovation. The dam was the first gravity flow dam built by a European settler in western Oklahoma, and Fullerton became a successful regional farmer due to his effective irrigation system. It is even more notable because Fullerton designed the system himself using a homemade transit, and the system was built using unskilled manual labor and mules.

In addition, the reservoir which the dam created became a popular local attraction. However, Fullerton's farm began to fail around 1905 because of falling produce prices and increasing production expenses. Several land developers offered to buy him out but he refused the offers. He had to borrow a large amount of money to stay in business, and was heavily in debt when he died in 1916. His whole operation was sold to satisfy creditors. The dam broke permanently during a 1919 flood. The stone ruins remain at the site of the dam and are generally in the same condition as they were following the flood.

The site of the dam was added to the National Register of Historic Places on November 7, 1976.

Note

References

Dams on the National Register of Historic Places in Oklahoma
Buildings and structures in Jackson County, Oklahoma
Former dams
National Register of Historic Places in Jackson County, Oklahoma